Mugwump is an early video game where the user is tasked with finding "Mugwumps" randomly hidden on a 10×10 grid. It is a text-based game written in BASIC.

Development 
Mugwump was written by Bob Albrecht of the People's Computer Company and inspired by a similar program called Hide and Seek developed by students of Bud Valenti from Project SOLO in Pittsburgh, Pennsylvania. A sample run first appeared in the People's Computer Company Journal Vol. 1 No. 3 in February 1973, and source code was published in Vol. 1 No. 4 in April 1973. Source code was again published in Vol. 3 No. 1 in September 1974. Mugwump was later included in the book BASIC Computer Games.

Gameplay 
The user enters a pair of single-digit co-ordinates in the range from 0 to 9 which are the x,y coordinates to scan. If the mugwump is at that location then the user is alerted. Otherwise the user is told the distance from the scanned coordinates to the mugwump. The game ends after ten turns or when the mugwump has been found.

Legacy 
Frustration with grid based games like Mugwump led Gregory Yob to produce Hunt the Wumpus.

References 

 Ahl, David H. (Ed.) (1978), BASIC Computer Games.  New York: Workman Publishing.  .

External links 
 Mugwump play helper in HTML5
 Arduino conversion of Mugwump by Emmanuel Turner
 C source conversion of Mugwump by Joe Larson on github.com (archived)

1973 video games
Mainframe games
Public-domain software with source code
Video games developed in the United States
Video games with textual graphics